Argiocnemis rubescens is a species of damselfly in the family Coenagrionidae,
commonly known as the red-tipped shadefly. It is a widespread species extending from India to southern China, south-east Asia, New Guinea and Australia.

It prefers fresh still waters such as pools, marshes and swamps. The adult is a small to medium-sized damselfly with a length of 35 to 40mm, and the hindwing less than 22mm. When immature it is a pale reddish brown. The mature male is dark with pale green stripes on the thorax, and red on segments 8 and 9. In Australia, the distribution is in suitable habitat from Shark Bay in the west, across the north of the continent, to about Point Hicks in the south-east. The taxon has been assessed in the IUCN Red List as least concern.

Etymology
The species name rubescens is a Latin word meaning reddish. Edmond de Sélys Longchamps named this species of damselfly after the colour of the upper surface of its abdomen.

Gallery

References

Coenagrionidae
Odonata of Australia
Insects of Australia
Taxa named by Edmond de Sélys Longchamps
Insects described in 1877
Damselflies